Hartstonge may refer to:

 John Hartstonge (1654–1717), English-born Church of Ireland bishop
 Sir Henry Hartstonge, 3rd Baronet (c. 1725–1797), Irish politician and landowner 
 Price Hartstonge (1692–1743), Anglo-Irish politician
 Standish Hartstonge (disambiguation), multiple people